Nika Nesgoda is an American artist and conceptual photographer.

Virgin Series
In 2002, Nesgoda shot her hagiographic photographic series, VIRGIN to emulate the paintings of the Old Masters and the dichotomous use of prostitutes as artists' models, in particular Michelangelo Merisi da Caravaggio, whose painting Death of the Virgin portrayed a model who was also a sex worker.  Nesgoda's series, VIRGIN, features adult film actresses to portray the Virgin Mary and references the historical use of marginalized women in religious art. In 2018, Time magazine published the series and revealed that the model in her photograph, Annuntiatio which pays homage to the 1333 Simone Martini and Lippo Memmi's Annunciation portrays the pornographic film actress Stormy Daniels as the Virgin Mary.

According to Artnet News, Nesgoda "sought to combine Christian iconography with contemporary pornography to draw attention to the fact that, from a certain perspective, both represented reductive, misogynistic views of women".

Nesgoda told the New York Post, "My photographs are a playful look at art history. Pornography is art that we deem excessive in a way. Throughout history, women were seen as virgins or whores. I'm not trying to be ironic. The way I see it, with art you look at something and make a judgment whether you like it or not – but things are not always what they seem."

In a 2019 interview with Musée Magazine,  the artist stated that "[t]he moment the idea came to me of placing adult film stars into the role of the Virgin Mary, was when I asked myself, 'who is actually worthy of being worshiped?'...Why should my choice of model bother anyone, if our highest calling as human beings is to have compassion and be inclusive?" Nesgoda said that she initially "...had Catholic guilt, so I went to speak with a Jesuit priest and a nun I knew. I asked if it was okay for me to do this. They said we are all human and everyone strays from the path, no one is without sin, and these women are worthy."

Bill Donohue of the Catholic League has publicly criticized Nesgoda's work as an affront on Catholicism. Nesgoda told Vice News that her work is meant to be a study of the role of women in church-commissioned art. "I think [critics like Donohue are] missing the point... some of the famous artists the church sought after to paint cathedrals and whatnot would bring their models – and a lot of these models were prostitutes and 'sinful women' – and the church condoned it, under the auspices of trying to convert them into good Christians".

Other Work
Nesgoda spent much of her earlier artistic life focused on portraiture, her current work is devoted to "landscapes in tiny objects, change, and texture. Her Landscrapes are large-format photographic images that explore the texture and nature of tiny objects through close-up photography.

Personal life
Nesgoda is a graduate of Columbia University. In 2004 she took a ten-year break from art to raise her three children.

References

External links
 

Living people
Place of birth missing (living people)
21st-century American photographers
Fine art photographers
1972 births
21st-century American women photographers